Graphoderus liberus is a species of predaceous diving beetle in the family Dytiscidae. It is found in North America.

References

 D.J. Larson, Y. Alarie, and R.E. Roughley. (2001). Predaceous Diving Beetles (Coleoptera: Dytiscidae) of the Nearctic Region, with emphasis on the fauna of Canada and Alaska. NRC 43253.
 Nilsson, Anders N. (2001). World Catalogue of Insects, volume 3: Dytiscidae (Coleoptera), 395.
 Webster, Reginald P. (2008). "New predaceous diving beetle (Coleoptera: Dytiscidae) records for New Brunswick and Canada with new distribution information on some rarely collected species". Journal of the Acadian Entomological Society, vol. 4, 38–45.

Further reading

 Arnett, R. H. Jr., and M. C. Thomas. (eds.). (21 December 2000) American Beetles, Volume I: Archostemata, Myxophaga, Adephaga, Polyphaga: Staphyliniformia. CRC Press LLC, Boca Raton, Florida. 
 Arnett, Ross H. (2000). American Insects: A Handbook of the Insects of America North of Mexico. CRC Press.
 Richard E. White. (1983). Peterson Field Guides: Beetles. Houghton Mifflin Company.

Dytiscidae
Beetles described in 1825